Heiligenblut am Großglockner is a municipality in the district of Spittal an der Drau in Carinthia, Austria.

Geography

At the northwestern edge of Carinthia and bordering East Tyrol and the state of Salzburg state, Heiligenblut is located in a high valley of the High Tauern range within the Central Eastern Alps. It is situated at the foot of the Grossglockner, the highest mountain in Austria, and of the Pasterze Glacier. Neighbouring peaks include the Johannisberg and the Fuscherkarkopf in the north, both part of the Alpine divide marking the Carinthia-Salzburg border. The municipal area comprises the cadastral communities of Apriach, Rojach, and Zlapp und Hof.

The municipality is also the southern starting point of the scenic Grossglockner High Alpine Road to Bruck in the state of Salzburg, the former Hochtor Pass, today the continuation of the B107 highway from Lienz in East Tyrol.

The 1.6 km-long (1-mile) tunnel is filled with water during the summer but serves as a railway tunnel leading to the Fleißalm winter sports region in winter.

History

A chapel at Heiligenblut in the Duchy of Carinthia was first mentioned in 1271, containing a relic of the Blood of Christ. According to legend, a flask of the Holy Blood, which is today kept in a sacrament house, was brought here in 914 AD from the Hagia Sophia in Constantinople by a Danish knight called Briccius (Frederick, not to be confused with Saint Brice), once in the service of Emperor Constantine VII. On his way home across the Alps, he was buried by an avalanche and in the face of death hid the relic in an open wound at his calf. His corpse was later found by local peasants at a place where three ears of wheat broke through the snow—as rendered in the Heiligenblut coat of arms.

The Gothic pilgrimage church dedicated to Saint Vincent of Saragossa, with its prominent spire, was built between 1460 and 1491. The church also houses a late-Gothic winged altarpiece from 1520, and a crypt and tomb containing Briccius' mortal remains.

A transhumance agricultural as well as a gold mining from ancient history to the Middle Ages, Heiligenblut was a stop on the bridle path and later Roman road leading to the Hochtor Pass across the Alps, probably already in use during the Hallstatt culture which followed on from the Late Bronze Age. In 1834 Archduke John of Austria had a first mountain hut built beneath the pass, and a driveway was constructed from 1875. The opening of the Grossglockner Road in 1935 decisively promoted the economy of Heiligenblut as a tourism and mountaineering resort.

Politics

Seats in the municipal assembly (Gemeinderat) as of 2015 local elections:
HBL (citizens' list leaning towards Austrian People's Party): 12
FBL (citizens' list): 3

Twin towns — sister cities

Heiligenblut is twinned with:
 Sodankylä, Finland
 Julian, California, United States

References

Literature
Kaufmann, J.: Örtliche Entwicklung und Ortsbild der Gemeinde Heiligenblut am Großglockner (master's thesis), Vienna, 1984.

Cities and towns in Spittal an der Drau District
Glockner Group
Schober Group